Gateway Green is a  park in northeast Portland, Oregon, known for catering to off-road cyclists.

It is located between Interstate 205 and Interstate 84 on the former site of the Rocky Butte county jail. The park opened June 2017, but construction to further expand the park began March 2020 is expected to be complete by November 2020.

References

External links

 Gateway Green, Portland Parks & Recreation, City of Portland, Oregon

2017 establishments in Oregon
Northeast Portland, Oregon
Parks in Portland, Oregon
Protected areas established in 2017